The Glorioso snake-eyed skink (Cryptoblepharus gloriosus) is a species of lizard in the family Scincidae. It is endemic to the Glorioso Islands.

References

Cryptoblepharus
Reptiles described in 1893
Taxa named by Leonhard Stejneger